The Washington Military Department is a branch of the state government of Washington, United States.

The Washington State Military Department has several major operational divisions:  
 Washington Emergency Management Division 
 Washington Army National Guard
 Washington Air National Guard
 Washington State Guard
 Washington Youth Academy
 State & Federal Support Services
These divisions use state and federal resources to perform homeland defense, homeland security, and emergency mitigation, preparedness, response and recovery activities.

Washington State Emergency Operations Center 

The Washington State Emergency Operations Center is located at Camp Murray, under the Military Department's Emergency Management Division. The 28,000 square foot facility, occupied since mid 1998, is built on rollers to withstand earthquakes. The Emergency Operations Center was activated for the 2012 Washington wildfires, 2015 Washington wildfires, 2016 Washington wildfires, 2018 Washington wildfires, and for the 2020 coronavirus pandemic.

See also
Washington Naval Militia

References

External links

Military in Washington (state)
Military